Parker's Building and Parker's Buildings redirect to here
Parker Building, Parker's Building or Parker's Buildings (or variations with Block or Plant or Complex) may refer to;

in Canada
Parker Building, a building at Laurentian University in Toronto, which houses the campus radio station, CKLU-FM

in the United Kingdom
Parker's Buildings, Chester, a Grade II listed building in Chester, UK

in the United States (by state then city or town)
Imperial Granum-Joseph Parker Buildings, New Haven, Connecticut, NRHP-listed
Parker Metal Decoration Company Plant, Baltimore, Maryland, NRHP-listed
Parker Mill Complex, Ann Arbor, Michigan, listed on the NRHP in Washtenaw County, Michigan
Parker and Dunstan Hardware/Dr. E. D. Lewis Building, Otisville, Michigan, listed on the NRHP in Genesee County, Michigan
Parker Building (Brainerd, Minnesota), NRHP-listed, in Crow Wing County
Parker's Store, Goffstown, New Hampshire, listed on the NRHP in Hillsborough County, New Hampshire
Parker Building (New York City), a 12-storey office and loft building destroyed by fire in 1909
Parker Masonic Hall, Parker, South Dakota, NRHP-listed, in Turner County
Parker Lumber Company Complex, Bryan, Texas, listed on the NRHP in Brazos County, Texas
Parker and Weeter Block, Price, Utah, listed on the NRHP in Carbon County, Utah

See also
Parker House (disambiguation)
Parker School (disambiguation)
Parker Barn (disambiguation)